Merlin is the self-titled third studio album released by the former Yugoslavia's band, Merlin. The album was released in 1987.

Track listing

External links
Merlin on Dino Merlin's official web site

Dino Merlin albums
1987 albums